The Council of Europe Convention on the Manipulation of Sports Competitions, better known as the Macolin Convention, is a multilateral treaty that aims to prevent, detect, and punish match fixing in sport. The convention was concluded in Macolin/Magglingen, Switzerland, on 18 September 2014. At its conclusion, it was immediately signed by 15 states of the Council of Europe; it is open to ratification of Council of Europe states and other states that were involved in its negotiation. The treaty will enter into force after being ratified by five states, three of which must be Council of Europe states.

A major focus of the convention is to prevent and punish illegal sports betting operations and to prevent conflicts of interest in legal sports betting operators and sports organisations.

The Macolin Convention entered into force on 1 September 2019. It has been ratified by Norway, Portugal, Ukraine, Moldova, Switzerland, Italy and Greece. It has been signed by 30 other European States and by Australia.

See also
list of Council of Europe treaties

References
"European nations sign treaty to fight match-fixing", The Washington Post, 18 September 2014.
"European ministers sign convention on match-fixing", Play the Game, 18 September 2014.

External links
Treaty text.
Signatories and ratifications.
Explanatory report.
Official Website.

Treaties concluded in 2014
Treaties not entered into force
Convention on the Manipulation of Sports Competitions
Convention on the Manipulation of Sports Competitions
Council of Europe treaties
Convention on the Manipulation of Sports Competitions
Manipulation of Sports Competitions
Treaties of Norway
Treaties of Portugal